Piano Sonata in F minor may refer to:

 Piano Sonata No. 1 (Beethoven)
 Piano Sonata No. 23 (Beethoven)
 Piano Sonata in F minor, WoO 47 No. 2 (Beethoven)
 Piano Sonata No. 3 (Brahms)
 Piano Sonata No. 1 (Prokofiev)
 Piano Sonata in F minor, D 625 (Schubert)
 Piano Sonata No. 3 (Schumann)
 Piano Sonata No. 1 (Scriabin)